Open College may refer to:

 Open Colleges, an Australian distance education course provider acquired by Apollo Group in 2013. Previously Cengage Education
 The Open College, is a distance learning college established in 2004 in Dublin, Ireland
 Open College (Toronto), a distance learning service that produced and broadcast on-air college credit courses on radio station CJRT-FM in Toronto from 1971 to 2003
 Open College (UK), a public distance learning college from 1987 to 1991
 Open College of the Arts, a distance learning independent arts college based in Barnsley in South Yorkshire, England
 NOCN, National Open College Network, a network of UK organisations developed to recognise informal learning achieved by adults
 Open Awards, a UK qualification awarding agency formerly known as the "Open College Network North West Region"
 AWQAF Africa Muslim Open College, an institution of AWQAF Africa's educational department in London 2005
 Open admissions, a non-competitive college admissions process in the United States in which the only criterion for entrance is a high school diploma or a General Educational Development certificate
 Open-door academic policy, a non-competitive college admissions process accepting all students without asking for evidence of previous education, experience, or references

See also 
Open university (disambiguation)